Frederick IV of Hohenstaufen (1145–1167) was duke of Swabia, succeeding his cousin, Frederick Barbarossa, Holy Roman Emperor, in 1152.

He was the son of Conrad III of Germany and his second wife Gertrude von Sulzbach and thus the direct heir of the crown, had there been true heredity. However, on his death bed, Conrad III allegedly advised the only two persons present, his nephew Frederick Barbarossa and the bishop of Bamberg, to nominate Frederick Barbarossa; and handed the Imperial insignia to him.

Barbarossa wasted no time in getting the Bavarian clerics to endorse him, and had the archbishop of Cologne convene a hurried election. There the electors of the Empire (minus their "primus inter pares", Henry I, Archbishop of Mainz, an ally of the Pope) elected Frederick Barbarossa to be King, instead of his six-year-old cousin Frederick. The younger man became Duke of Swabia instead.

Frederick participated in Barbarossa's campaigns in Italy, becoming one of the many casualties of the Imperial army. He succumbed to disease after occupying Rome in 1167. Barbarossa then gave Swabia to his own three-year-old son, Frederick V.

Marriage
Frederick IV married Gertrude of Bavaria. She was a daughter of Henry the Lion and his first wife Clementia of Zähringen. They had no known children.

Gertrude survived him and married Canute VI of Denmark. She died childless.

See also
Dukes of Swabia family tree

1145 births
1167 deaths
Dukes of Swabia
Hohenstaufen
Medieval child monarchs
12th-century German nobility
Sons of kings